Dharamshala is a city in Himachal Pradesh, India.

Dharamshala may refer to:

 Dharmasala, Jajpur, Orissa, a small town near Jajpur in India
 Dharmashala, Kannur, a small town in Kannur
 Dharamshala (type of building), resthouses or sarais in India or Nepal